Jiang Huajun (born 8 October 1984) is a table tennis player from Hong Kong, China.

Career records
Singles (as of September 4, 2015)
Olympic Games: Round of 16 (2012)
World Championships: Round of 16 (2009, 11, 13, 15).
World Cup appearances: 8. Record: runner-up (2010).
Pro Tour winner (4): Kuwait Open 2006, Chile, Korea Open 2007, Spanish Open 2013. Runner-up (3): Korea Open 2002. Korea Open 2009. Spanish Open 2011.
Pro Tour Grand Finals appearances: 5. Record: QF (2007).
Asian Games: QF (2010).
Asian Championships: QF (2007, 09).
Asian Cup: 1st (2007). 2nd (2003).

Women's doubles
World Championships: SF (2009, 2011).
Pro Tour winner (6): Egypt Open 2002. Chile, China (Shanghai) Open 2008. Spanish Open 2011, China (Shanghai) Open 2012, Qatar Open 2015. Runner-up (8): Swedish Open 2001. Austrian Open 2002. Croatian Open 2003. Chile Open 2007. Kuwait, Korea Open 2009. German Open 2012. Hungarian Open 2015
Pro Tour Grand Finals appearances: 5. Record: runner-up (2009, 10). SF (2008, 2012).
Asian Championships: QF (2007, 09).

Mixed doubles
World Championships: SF (2011, 2013).
Asian Games: runner-up (2010).

Team
Olympic Games: 5th (2012)
World Championships: 3rd (2008, 2012, 2014).
World Team Cup: 3rd (2009, 2013).

References

Hong Kong female table tennis players
Living people
1984 births
Asian Games medalists in table tennis
Table tennis players at the 2012 Summer Olympics
Olympic table tennis players of Hong Kong
Table tennis players at the 2010 Asian Games
Table tennis players at the 2014 Asian Games
People from Binzhou
Table tennis players from Shandong
Medalists at the 2010 Asian Games
Asian Games bronze medalists for Hong Kong
World Table Tennis Championships medalists